Nashville Mirrors is a studio album by American country singer-songwriter Bill Anderson. It was released in 1980 on MCA Records and was produced by Buddy Killen. His 30th studio album, it was also Anderson's final album effort with his long-time record label. The album included three singles that reached minor positions on the Billboard country songs chart.

Background and content
Nashville Mirrors was recorded in September 1979 in sessions held produced by Buddy Killen. It was Anderson's final release produced by Killen, after collaborating with each other for four years. The record would also be Anderson's final album with MCA. His contract with the label would remain through 1981 before departing and recording for a smaller, independent company. The project consisted of ten tracks. Seven of these tracks were written or co-written by Anderson. Also included were cover versions of songs previously recorded and made successful by other artists. Included is the track, "We've Got Tonite", which was first a hit by its writer, Bob Seger. Other compositions were written by Nashville songwriters such as Curly Putman and Mike Kosser.

Release
Nashville Mirrors was released in 1980 via MCA Records. It became Anderson's 30th studio album upon its release. The project was issued in two formats. First, it was issued as a vinyl LP, featuring five songs on both sides of the record. It was also issued as a cassette in a similar song format. It was his first studio recording since the early 1960s to not chart in any Billboard Magazine chart publications. However, the album's three singles did chart on the Billboard Hot Country Singles survey. Its first single, "More Than a Bedroom Thing", was released in November 1979. The single only became a minor hit, reaching number 50 in early 1980. Its second single issued was "Make Mine Night Time" in April 1980. It became Anderson's final top forty single following its peak in May. Its third single, "I Want That Feelin' Again" only spent three weeks on the country chart and peaked at number 83. Additionally, "More Than a Bedroom Thing" was Anderson's final single to make a chart appearance on the Canadian RPM Country Singles list, peaking at number 71.

Track listing

Personnel
All credits are adapted from the liner notes of Nashville Mirrors.

Musical personnel

 Bill Anderson – lead vocals
 Randy Bethune – background vocals
 David Briggs – piano
 Charles Chappelaer – horn
 Phil Forrest – background vocals
 Jim Glaser – background vocals
 Mike Johnston – steel guitar
 Louis Johnson – bass
 Buddy Killen – bass
 Larry Londin – drums
 Fred Newell – guitar
 Susan Ladd – background vocals
 Susan Meredith – background vocals
 Monty Parkey – background vocals

 Hargus "Pig" Robbins – piano
 Jerry Shook – guitar
 Jack Smith – steel guitar
 Don Sheffield – horn
 Donna Sheridan – background vocals
 Buddy Spicher – fiddle
 Gordon Stoker – background vocals
 Mike Streeter – background vocals
 Henry Strzelecki – bass
 Dennis Wilson – background vocals
 Hurshel Wiginton – background vocals
 Bobby Wood – piano
 Reggie Young – guitar

Technical personnel
 Mike Bradley – engineering
 Dennis Carney – cover photo
 Buddy Killen – producer
 Don Paul Millie – cover photo (back)
 Travis Turk – engineering
 Ernie Winfrey – engineering

Release history

References

1980 albums
Bill Anderson (singer) albums
MCA Records albums